Gor is the fictional setting for a series of sword and planet novels written by philosophy professor John Lange, writing as John Norman. The setting was first described in the 1966 novel Tarnsman of Gor. The series is inspired by science fantasy pulp fiction works by Edgar Rice Burroughs, such as the Barsoom series. It also includes erotica and philosophy content. The Gor series repeatedly depicts men abducting and physically and sexually brutalizing women, who grow to enjoy their submissive state.  According to The Encyclopedia of Science Fiction, Norman's "sexual philosophy" is "widely detested", but the books have inspired a Gorean subculture.

The series has been variously referred to by publishers with several names, including The Chronicles of Counter-Earth (Ballantine Books), The Saga of Tarl Cabot (DAW Books), Gorean Cycle (Tandem Books), Gorean Chronicles (Masquerade Books), Gorean Saga (Open Road Media) and The Counter-Earth Saga (DAW Books, for novels with a protagonist other than Tarl Cabot).

Series description

Background
In an interview with the speculative fiction anthology Polygraff, John Norman spoke at length about the creation of the Gor universe and his influences.

"The Counter-Earth, or Antichthon, is from Greek cosmology. Speculation on such a world, you see, is ancient. One of the premises of the Gorean series is that a race of aliens, whom we might speak of as the Priest-Kings, have a technology at their disposal compared to which ours would be something like that in the Bronze Age."

"I think, pretty clearly, the three major influences on my work are Homer, Freud, and Nietzsche. Interestingly, however obvious this influence might be, few, if any, critics, commentators, or such, have called attention to it."In the same interview, he said "one of the pleasures of writing science fiction is the development of, and characterization of, alien life forms".

Setting
Gor is described as a habitable planet in the Solar System that shares the same orbit as Earth, but it is linearly opposed to Earth and consequently always hidden by the Sun, making direct observation of it from Earth impossible. The flora, fauna and customs of Gor are intricately detailed. Norman populates his planet with the equivalents of Roman, Greek, Native American, Viking, Inuit and other cultures. In the novels, these various population groups are transplants from Earth brought there by spacecraft through the behind-the-scenes rulers of Gor, the Priest-Kings, an extraterrestrial species of insectoid appearance. The Gorean humans are permitted advanced architectural, agricultural and medical skills (including life extension), but are forced to remain primitive in the fields of transportation, communication and weaponry (at approximately the level of Classical Mediterranean civilization) due to restrictions on technology imposed by the Priest-Kings. The most advanced form of transportation is the riding of large predatory birds called tarns by masterful men known as tarnsmen. The limitation of technology is imposed to ensure the safety of both the Priest-Kings and the other indigenous and transplanted beings on Gor, who would otherwise possibly come to harm due to the humans' belligerent tendencies.

The planet Gor has lower gravity than the Earth (which allows for the existence of large flying creatures and tall towers connected by aerial bridges in the cities) and would have an even lower gravity if not for the technology of the Priest-Kings. The known geography of Gor consists mainly of the western seaboard of a continent that runs from the Arctic in the north to south of the equator, with the Thassa ocean to the west, and the Voltai mountain range forming an eastern boundary at many latitudes. There are also offshore islands in the ocean and some relatively sparsely settled plains to the east of the Voltai. The word "Gor" itself means "home stone" in the Gorean language, the native language of the "northern civilized cities of known Gor" (which resemble ancient Greco-Roman city-states in many respects), and a widely spoken lingua franca in many other areas.

Plotlines
Most of the novels in the series are action and sexual adventures, with many of the military engagements borrowing liberally from historic ones, such as the trireme battles of ancient Greece and the castle sieges of medieval Europe. Ar, the largest city in known Gor, has resemblances to the ancient city of Rome, and its land empire is opposed by the sea-power of the island of Cos.

The series is an overlapping of planetary romance and sword and planet. The first book, Tarnsman of Gor, opens with scenes reminiscent of scenes in the first book of the Barsoom series by Edgar Rice Burroughs; both feature the protagonist narrating his adventures after being transported to another world. These parallels end after the first few books, when the stories of the books begin to be structured along a loose story arc involving the struggles of the city-state of Ar and the island of Cos to control the Vosk river area, as well as the struggles at a higher level between the non-human Priest-Kings and the Kurii (another alien race) to control Gor and Earth.

Most of the books are narrated by transplanted British professor Tarl Cabot, master swordsman, as he engages in adventures involving Priest-Kings, Kurii, and humans. Books 7, 11, 19, 22, 26, 27, 31, 34 and parts of 32 are narrated by abducted Earth women who are made into slaves. Books 14, 15, and 16 are narrated by male abductee Jason Marshall. Book 28 is narrated by an unknown Kur, but features Tarl Cabot. Book 30 and parts of 32 are narrated by three Gorean men: a mariner, a scribe and a merchant/slaver.

The series features several sentient alien races. The most important to the books are the insectoid Priest-Kings and the huge, sharp-clawed, predatory Kurii, both spacefarers from foreign star systems. The Priest-Kings rule Gor as disinterested custodians, leaving humans to their own affairs as long as they abide by certain restrictions on technology. The Kurii are an aggressive, invasive race with advanced technology (but less so than that of the Priest-Kings) who wish to colonize both Gor and Earth. The power of the Priest-Kings is diminished after the "Nest War" described in the third book and the Priest-Kings and Kurii struggle against each other via their respective human agents and spies.

Early entries in the series were plot-driven space opera adventures, but later entries grew more philosophical and sexual. Many subplots run the course of several books and tie back to the main plot in later books. Some of these plots begin in the first book, but most are underway in the first 10 books.

Publication
DAW Books, which published the Gor series from the 8th volume (Hunters of Gor) through the 25th volume (Magicians of Gor), subsequently decided to cease publication of the books, citing low sales; Norman attributes the decision to feminist influences, saying in 1996:

Tarnsman of Gor was published in late 1966. It has been reprinted 22 times...I have recently signed contracts for fresh French and German sales, and have recently been published for the first time in Czechoslovakia. There have been recent Spanish and Italian sales. There's no evidence that my books no longer sell...After DAW refused to buy any more Gor books, I sold a three-part Telnarian series to Brian Thomsen of Warner Books. The first book, The Chieftain, had a 67 percent sell-through. The second, The Captain, had a 91 percent sell-through, which is the sort of thing that would make Stephen King rush over to shake your hand...Brian Thomsen, my Warner editor for the Telnarian series...was replaced by an editor from one of the blacklisting presses, one that explicitly informed my agent they would not consider anything by John Norman. That new editor canceled the series despite its success and without waiting to see how the third book, The King, would do. That way things are made nicely clear...

"Unfortunately for me, only about seven or eight publishing houses maintain a mass-market paperback line in science fiction and fantasy; this small, knit group effectively controls the market. With such a group, a blacklist need not be an explicit, formal written or oral agreement subscribed to by a gathered cabal pledged to secrecy. It is an understanding that a certain individual is to be ostracized, excluded, methodologically overlooked or such."

Starting in 2001, John Norman's books were published by E-Reads as ebooks and print copies. According to their website, "they are among E-Reads’ biggest sellers". Open Road Integrated Media acquired E-Reads in 2014.

Bibliography

Adaptations
Two films have been made, Gor in 1987 and Outlaw of Gor in 1989 (also known as Outlaw).

While not officially connected to John Norman's work, Fencer of Minerva is a Japanese animated series containing many of the elements and ideas discussed in Gorean philosophy.

During the mid-1990s, an attempt was made to publish an authorized graphic novel adaptation of the Gor series under Vision Entertainment. The project collapsed under a combination of financial issues and the nature of the imagery, which violated Canadian law, where the printer was located.

A Gor sim was established on Second Life in July 2012. In it, characters interact in standard Middle Age scenarios, combat, and sexual situations. The Tavern at the City of Thentis is a popular attraction.

Kajira

In John Norman's Gor novels, a kajira is a female slave or slave girl. The phrase "la kajira"  is said to mean "I am a slave girl" in the Gorean language, the most widely spoken lingua franca in the known regions of the planet Gor (this is one of the few complete Gorean-language sentences given in the Gor novels). The word is usually seen in the feminine form "kajira" (pl. "kajirae"), as most slaves in the Gorean lifestyle are female; the masculine forms are "kajirus" and "kajiri" (with endings taken from the nominative forms of Latin first and second declension nouns, as also seen in words such as "alumna"/"alumnus", etc.). The construction "kajiras" is incorrect, but is occasionally seen in third-party writing.

There exist various techniques in Gorean culture to teach Gorean slaves' corresponding conduct. Slave tasks may include not only sexual slavery, but also the ability to maintain a household, possess artistic skills, wear an appealing outfit and address the master in a certain manner.

Marking
To indicate a slave as a particular owner's property, a collar with the owner's name is placed upon the slave (male and female slaves are both collared).

Gorean slave women are usually branded, which means they are marked with certain signs burned into the flesh on being enslaved.  The most common is the kef brand: "about an inch and a half in height, and a half inch in width. A rather simple, delicate, graceful, almost floral mark, in cursive script. Appearing slender, more vertical, more like a stem with floral, cursive curled loops. A rather severe, straight line staff, with two, upturned, frondlike curls, adjacent to it, joined where they touch the staff on its right. It bears a distant, remote resemblance to the printed letter K."

Classifications
Kajirae have a plethora of types of varying prestige depending on various characteristics, including the following:

By virginity status

Red silk girl: A kajira who is not a virgin.
White silk girl: A kajira 'not yet opened to men' (i.e., a virgin), a case which is depicted very rarely in the novels as a virgin kajira will usually be deflowered shortly after her enslavement.

By origin

Barbarian: The term "barbarian" usually refers to those who do not speak the main common language of known Gor and/or who are unassimilated to typical Gorean city-state culture.  In the context of kajirae, it can refer to those who were brought from Earth by a journey of acquisition.  Since they have never had any home stone, barbarian girls are often considered natural slaves, occupying the lowest rank and considered the most sexual.
Gorean-born
Passion slave: A kajira who has been bred through selective breeding for particularly desired physical or psychological traits, as opposed to other native Gorean kajirae who were usually born free.

By employment

Flute girl: A kajira versed in playing the flute. They are employed at feasts and may also serve sexual tasks.
Kettle girl / Kettle-and-mat girl: A kajira employed exclusively for domestic works is referred to as a kettle girl or pot girl. If the kajira's function is divided between household task and sexual service, she is known with the comparatively more prestigious moniker kettle-and-mat girl.
State slave: A kajira owned by a particular polity and used for the domestic needs of citizens.
Tower slave: A kajira owned as a maid in a private household.
Message girl: A kajira who delivers secret messages.
Paga slave or paga slut: A kajira who serves the alcoholic drink paga at a tavern. Their service usually includes sexual tasks.
Pleasure slave: A kajira whose main function is providing sexual services. However, her training also includes broader skills, such as dancing and cooking.
Prostitutes: Kajirae employed in prostitution by their masters.
Coin girl: A kajira used by her master as a streetwalker. 
Camp slave: A kajira rented out for satisfying sexual needs during military campaigns. 
Bath girl: A kajira who works as a prostitute and masseuse in a bathhouse. 
Feast slave: A kajira rented out at feasts as a pleasure slave.

Kajirus
Kajiri (male slaves or slave boys) also exist on the planet Gor, but they are far fewer than kajirae, since Gorean men can only rarely be effectively "tamed", so that most male slaves are considered inherently slightly dangerous, and have little value other than as unskilled hard labor in work gangs which must often be kept under continual armed guard. Men conquered in war who are not left free are more often than not killed than enslaved, while women in the same situation are almost always enslaved (since kajirae are a readily-negotiable commodity, among other reasons).

A male slave kept by a woman owner for bedroom duties is a "silk slave" (while most male slaves on Gor are used for unskilled hard labor in work gangs). When a free woman makes use of a kajirus sexually, he is often chained so that he is unable to hold her in his arms — since allowing this would be considered to add a note of male domination to the lovemaking. Some free women carefully avoid kissing a kajirus when making sexual use of him, since they would consider it degrading to soil their lips by touching them to the body of a mere slave. Note that only a small minority of rich free women on Gor own silk slaves and (in contrast to the usual situation with free men and kajirae) it is often not very easy or convenient for a free woman to obtain the sexual use of a kajirus whom she does not personally own (in the city of Ar, the largest city of known Gor, it is strictly forbidden by law).

The phrase "lo kajirus" is said to mean "I am a slave boy." Silk slaves are generally despised by free men on Gor and their type of slavery is often considered to be rather unnatural. Kajiri do not usually wear locked collars; rather, they wear a band of iron.

Reception
The Gor novels have been criticized for their focus on relationships between dominant men and submissive women, the latter often in positions of slavery. The Encyclopedia of Fantasy has stated that the first several books are "passable exercises" of Edgar Rice Burroughs-style fiction while "later volumes degenerate into extremely sexist, sadomasochistic pornography involving the ritual humiliation of women, and as a result have caused widespread offence". Science fiction/fantasy author Michael Moorcock has suggested that the Gor novels should be placed on the top shelves of bookstores, saying, "I’m not for censorship but I am for strategies which marginalize stuff that works to objectify women and suggests women enjoy being beaten."

See also

Gorean subculture
Imaginative Sex
Story of O
Telnarian Histories
Time Slave

References

External links

 
 John Norman's Chronicles of Gor, current semi-official site
 List of Gorean animals

 
BDSM literature
Fantasy worlds
Fictional planets
Fictional universes
Planetary romances
Portal fantasy
Science fiction book series
Science fiction erotica
Series of books
Novels set on fictional planets
Works published under a pseudonym
Counter-Earths
Del Rey books
Book series introduced in 1966